Bonneton is a French surname. Notable people with the surname include:

Fernand Bonneton (1890–1922), French World War I flying ace
Valérie Bonneton (born 1970), French actress

French-language surnames

Bonneton (Super Mario Odyssey) is the capital of the Cap Kingdom.Super Mario Odyssey